Around the World is a 1967 Indian Hindi-language romantic comedy film written and directed by Pachhi. It stars Raj Kapoor as an Indian who travels around the world with five thousand rupees. The film also starred Rajshree, Ameeta, Om Prakash, and Mehmood. It was India's first film to be released in 70 mm format and was shot all around the world.

Plot 

A man accompanies his uncle to Tokyo but finds himself in a dilemma when he must travel to Europe immediately,

A young millionaire is left in the lurch when his employee sabotages his travel plans. Now, stuck in Japan with just $8, he somehow obtains a job aboard a cruise ship and also meets a beautiful girl.

Cast
 Raj Kapoor as Raj Singh
 Rajshree as Rita
 Pran as Pran
 Om Prakash
 Mehmood Ali as Albata
 Sir Frank Worrell West Indies Test Cricketer Special Appearance

Soundtrack

Reception
In 1977, Kapoor told to India Today that he dislikes the film, he also criticised Pachchi's direction, and that he acted in the film for money, because "like Orson Welles, I had to act in bad films to make good ones myself".

References

External links
 

1960s Hindi-language films
1967 films
1967 romantic comedy films
Films scored by Shankar–Jaikishan
Hindi-language comedy films
Indian romantic comedy films